The Old Custom House is a historic customs house located at Yorktown, York County, Virginia.  It was built in 1721, and is a 2 1/2-story brick Colonial building with a hipped roof. It has a corbeled brick interior end chimney.  An extensive restoration project was undertaken by Richmond architect W. Duncan Lee in 1929.  Also on the property are a contributing kitchen, necessary, and brick wall, all added during the restoration.

It was added to the National Register of Historic Places in 1999.

The Custom House is now a museum operated by the Comte de Grasse Chapter Daughters of the American Revolution.  It is open on Sundays from June to October.

References

External links
 Comte de Grasse Chapter Daughters of the American Revolution
Customs House, Main & Read Streets, Yorktown, York County, VA: 3 photos at Historic American Buildings Survey

Historic American Buildings Survey in Virginia
Custom houses in the United States
Government buildings on the National Register of Historic Places in Virginia
National Register of Historic Places in York County, Virginia
Colonial architecture in Virginia
Government buildings completed in 1721
Buildings and structures in York County, Virginia
Museums in York County, Virginia
History museums in Virginia
Custom houses on the National Register of Historic Places
1721 establishments in Virginia